The Battle of Sahagún (21 December 1808) was a cavalry clash at Sahagún, Spain, in which the British 15th Light Dragoons (Hussars) defeated two regiments of French cavalry during the Corunna Campaign of the Peninsular War. Losses to one of the French regiments were so heavy that it was subsequently disbanded. The action marked the final phase of the British army's advance into the interior of Spain, before they began their harrowing retreat to the coast and ultimate evacuation by sea.

Background
The Corunna campaign started with the Battle of Cardedeu.

Sir John Moore led a British army into the heart of northwestern Spain with the aim of aiding the Spanish in their struggle against French occupation.  However, Napoleon had entered Spain at the head of a large army intending to reestablish French interests. This, together with the fall of the Spanish capital Madrid to the French, made the position of the British army untenable.  Moore, whose headquarters was at Mayorga, was aware that he must retreat towards the coast in the face of the overwhelming odds ranged against him. However, he was also aware that Marshal Soult's apparently unsupported corps was nearby, on the Carrión River, and before beginning his retreat he wished to make a strike against Soult.  As part of this design the cavalry under Henry, Lord Paget were sent towards Soult, as a reconnaissance in force, ahead of the infantry.

Forces

The French fielded a brigade under César Alexandre Debelle composed of the 1st Provisional Chasseurs à cheval and the 8th Dragoons.

The British force was the 15th Light Dragoons (Hussars) from the brigade of Charles Stewart and the 10th Light Dragoons (Hussars) of John Slade's brigade, however, the latter regiment did not come into direct combat.

Battle

On a bitterly cold night Lord Paget ordered the 10th Hussars to move through the town of Sahagún, then occupied by a French cavalry force, whilst he made a sweep around Sahagún with the 15th Hussars in order that the French might be trapped. Unfortunately General John Slade was tardy in moving off with the 10th Hussars; the French cavalry became aware of the proximity of the British cavalry and exited from the town to the east unmolested. Slade apparently harangued his hussars with a lengthy and quite ludicrous speech, ending with the words: "blood and slaughter. March!" In the dawn light the French regiments, catching sight of the 15th Hussars to the south, formed up in two lines with the 1st Provisional Chasseurs (commanded by Colonel Tascher, a relative of the Empress Josephine - though he may not have been present) in front and the 8th Dragoons behind them. Unusually, the French cavalry received the charge of the British hussars whilst stationary and tried to halt it with carbine fire.

Emdsorf being an earlier action, 16 July 1760, in which the 15th had played a notable part. Not all of the 15th proved to be equally adept, it is reported that one clumsy hussar managed to shoot his own horse during the pursuit. It was so cold the hussars wore their pelisses, rather than having them slung over their shoulders, and many had cloaks over all. Eyewitnesses also spoke of numbed hands hardly able to grasp reins and sabres. The impact when the hussars met the chasseurs was terrible, as one British officer recorded: "horses and men were overthrown and a shriek of terror, intermixed with oaths, groans and prayers for mercy issued from the whole extent of their front." The impetus of the British hussars carried them through the ranks of the chasseurs and into those of the dragoons behind. The French force was broken, and it routed eastwards with the British in pursuit. Many French cavalrymen (though the chasseurs were largely of German origin) were taken prisoner at very little cost to the 15th Hussars. Two French lieutenant colonels were captured and the chasseurs, who lost many men captured, ceased to exist as a viable regiment. The 10th Hussars came up during the pursuit, however, they were initially mistaken for French cavalry. This caused the 15th Hussars to break off their pursuit to re-form, ending the action.

Aftermath

Moore's attack against Soult ended with the battle of Sahagun because the main French forces were approaching. He started instead the long, painful and almost disastrous British retreat ending with the Battle of Corunna, at the port on the Galician coast.  The presence of the British army had, as Moore intended, focused Napoleon's attention upon it allowing the Spanish forces some time to reorganise and regroup after the defeats they had suffered.

The 15th Hussars' charge and subsequent victory meant that the French cavalry were reluctant to fight the British cavalry for the remainder of the campaign. The French 1st Provisional Chasseurs were so depleted by their losses at Sahagun that they were disbanded.

The British Hussars were to gain one more victory over their French counterparts during the Corunna campaign when, on 29 December 1808, at the Battle of Benavente they drove Napoleon's elite Chasseurs à cheval of the Imperial Guard into the River Esla, capturing their commanding general, Lefebvre-Desnouettes.

The 15th Hussars were awarded "Sahagun" as a Battle Honour, which is still celebrated today by The Light Dragoons and B Battery Royal Horse Artillery which is now part of 1st Regiment Royal Horse Artillery.

Explanatory Notes

Notes

References

External links
 
 

Battles of the Peninsular War
Battles involving Spain
Battle of Sahagun
Battle of Sahagún
Battles of the Napoleonic Wars
Battles involving the United Kingdom
December 1808 events